Devrek is a town and district in Zonguldak Province in the Black Sea Region of Turkey. It was founded as Hamidiye, in the sanjak of Bolu. Devrek was incorporated into the Zonguldak Province on May 14, 1920. It is divided into five quarters, three subdistricts and seventy-six villages. The three subdistricts are Çaydeğirmeni, Eğerci, and Özbağı. The population of the Devrek district is 66,518. The mayor is Çetin Bozkurt (CHP).

Since 1984, in the third week of July, the Devrek Walking Stick and Culture Festival is held in the town. The most notable tourist destination in the area is Yedigöller National Park. During February and March there are pig hunting drives.

Geography
Devrek is located in an altitude of 86 meters and has an area of 1,080 km². It is 56 km from Zonguldak, 210 km from Ankara and 370 km from Istanbul. It is surrounded by mountains, the most notable ones being Babadağı, Göldağı, Akçasu and Yenice. The most important river passing through the region is Devrek creek. Devrek creek joins the Yenice creek in Gökçebey district and takes the name Filyos River. Pine, oak, fir, beech, elm, chestnut, and lime trees are found throughout the forest around Devrek. Its weather is cool during the summer and warm and rainy during the winter season.

History
In the late 19th and early 20th century, Devrek was part of the Kastamonu Vilayet of the Ottoman Empire. The name of the district, which is known as both Hızırbeyili and Devrek, was founded on September 5, 1887. It has been referred to as 'Hamidiye' for twenty-three years following the name of Abdul Hamid II.
The word meaning of the name of the district, which has been called Devrek again since 1910, means 'Monday' in Turkish, which has a reputation exceeding the boundaries of the region and is based on its market established in the district.

International relations

Twin towns
Devrek is twinned with:
 Arua, Uganda
 Betio, Kiribati
 Moroni, Comoros

Famous persons from Devrek
 Işık Koşaner (born 1945), General staff officer

References

External links

District governor's official website 
Devrek Baston information website 
Official website of devrek municipality 

Populated places in Zonguldak Province
Districts of Zonguldak Province